Ward Chamberlin (4 August 1921 – 23 February 2017) was a president of the US TV channel WETA for fifteen years. During his career he was also executive vice president at WNET in New York and senior vice president for PBS. He retired from public broadcasting in 2003. Ward was one of the founders of AFS Intercultural Programs and is among the veterans featured in Ken Burns' documentary The War.

References

1921 births
2017 deaths
PBS people
American nonprofit executives
American television executives
American Field Service personnel of World War II